Daniel Kysela (born December 19, 1970) is a Czech former professional ice hockey defenceman.

Kysela spent the majority of his career with HC Vítkovice of the Czech Extraliga. He played with the team from 1988 to 1997 and again briefly during the 1999–2000 season. Kysela also had spells for HC Olomouc and HC Havířov as well as in France for Lions de Lyon and Brest Albatros Hockey.

References

External links

1970 births
Living people
Brest Albatros Hockey players
Czech ice hockey defencemen
HC Havířov players
LHC Les Lions players
HC Olomouc players
Sportspeople from Ostrava
HC Vítkovice players
Czechoslovak ice hockey defencemen
Czech expatriate ice hockey people
Expatriate ice hockey players in France
Czech expatriate sportspeople in France